Prussia was a German state that formed the German Empire in 1871.

Prussia or Prussian may also refer to:

Prussia (region), a historical region on the south-eastern coast of the Baltic Sea that lent its name to the later German state

Countries
State of the Teutonic Order (1230–1525), founded in the Prussian region by the Teutonic Order
Prussian Confederation (1440–1466), an alliance of German Hanseatic cities in Prussia who rebelled against the Teutonic Knights
Royal Prussia (1466–1772), a province of the Polish Crown, created by the separation of Prussia into two parts
Duchy of Prussia (1525–1618), a duchy established in the eastern part of Prussia
Brandenburg-Prussia (1618–1701), a state created by the personal union of the Duchy of Prussia and the Margraviate of Brandenburg

Post-1800
Kingdom of Prussia (1701–1918), a kingdom established in Brandenburg-Prussia
Province of Prussia (1829–1878), a province of the Kingdom of Prussia, created by a union of the Provinces of East and West Prussia 
Free State of Prussia (1918–1945), a state of Germany after the abolition of the Kingdom of Prussia

Subdivisions
East Prussia, the eastern part of the region of Prussia
West Prussia, the western part of the region of Prussia
Province of West Prussia, a province of the Kingdom of Prussia, annexed from Poland in 1772 (former Royal Prussia), re-established 1878
Province of East Prussia, a province of the Kingdom of Prussia, created from former Ducal Prussia and Warmia in 1773, re-established 1878; an exclave of Germany after World War I
Posen-West Prussia, a province of the Free State of Prussia (1922–1938) (the western parts of former West Prussia that were retained by Germany)
Regierungsbezirk West Prussia, administrative region of the Province of East Prussia (1920–1938) (the eastern parts of former West Prussia that were retained by Germany)

People and languages
Prussians, an ethnic subgroup of Germans
Citizens of the state of Prussia
Old Prussians, Baltic tribes formerly inhabiting the region of Prussia
Old Prussian language, their language, now extinct
High Prussian, German dialect in East Prussia
Low Prussian, German dialect in East Prussia

Institutions
Prussian Army, army of the Kingdom of Prussia
Prussian Cultural Heritage Foundation, a foundation (est. 1957) holding museums and libraries left behind by the former Free State of Prussia
Evangelical State Church in Prussia, a former Protestant church body under changing names (1817–2004)
Prussian Navy, navy of the Kingdom of Prussia
Prussian Military Academy
Prussian Trust, German expellee company

Cities
Prussia in Saskatchewan, Canada, was renamed Leader in 1917.
Prusia, near Pozuzo, Oxapampa, in the central jungle of Peru
Prussia, Iowa, in the United States.
King of Prussia, Pennsylvania, in the United States.

See also
Preußen (disambiguation)
Preußisch (disambiguation)
Borussia (disambiguation)
Prussian blue (disambiguation)